Siah Gurab, also known as Siah Qorab or Siyah Gowdab or Seyah Qorab, may refer to:
 Siah Gurab-e Bala
 Siah Gurab-e Pain